Timeattack may refer to:

 Timeattack, a misspelling of time attack or time trial
 Timeattack, an alternative but now largely unused term for tool-assisted speedrun